Raul Donazar Calvet (3 November 1934 – 29 March 2008), simply known as Calvet, was a Brazilian footballer who played as a central defender.

Honours

Club
Grêmio
Campeonato Gaúcho: 1956, 1957, 1958, 1959

Santos
Intercontinental Cup: 1962, 1963
Copa Libertadores: 1962, 1963
Taça Brasil: 1961, 1962, 1963, 1964
Torneio Rio – São Paulo: 1963
Campeonato Paulista: 1960, 1961, 1962, 1964

References

External links

1934 births
2008 deaths
People from Bagé
Brazilian footballers
Association football defenders
Guarany Futebol Clube players
Grêmio Foot-Ball Porto Alegrense players
Santos FC players
Brazil international footballers
Sportspeople from Rio Grande do Sul